María Isabel Macedo (born August 2, 1975) is an Argentine actress and singer. She was the First Lady of Salta Province from September 24, 2016 until December 10, 2019.

Biography 
María Isabel Macedo was born in San Salvador de Jujuy, Argentina on August 2, 1975. For most of her childhood she lived in an apartment located in the neighborhood of Palermo, Ciudad de Buenos Aires, Argentina. Her father was a jujeño agronomist and her mother a teacher. Much of her family is from the province of San Salvador de Jujuy, Argentina. She is the youngest of four brothers, although in reality it is three half brothers, because they are children of their father's first wife. She studied at Saint Catherine's Moorlands School, and then enrolled in the University of Belgrano, in the hotel career. However, she never finished her university studies, since she decided to devote herself to the world of acting.

Career 
Isabel Macedo had her first acting opportunity in the telenovela Ricos y Famosos in 1997. However, she participated only in three chapters because it did not meet the necessary requirements. Her second appearance was in youth fiction titled Verano del '98, where she managed to get the role of Felicitas, who played between 1998 and 1999. From that moment, new opportunities appeared, and Isabel Macedo was considered, Muñeca Brava, Amor latino and 1000 milliones. In 2003, she made a special participation in telecomedy Son amores. Success and recognition came with her participation in youth fiction Floricienta, in which she played Delfina, the antagonist of the story, in his two seasons. In 2006, she was one of the protagonists of  Alma Pirata and in 2007 she had a participation in Mexican telecomedy Amor mío and she worked on telecomedy Son de Fierro for three months, replacing Mónica Antonópulos. Between 2008 and 2009 she was the main antagonist of the telenovela Don Juan y Su Bella Dama, starring Joaquín Furriel, Romina Gaetani and Benjamín Vicuña, which ended on March 9, 2009 becoming a success. Her character from Serena Monterrey earn her her first nomination for Martín Fierro Awards. In the summer of that same year she won the role of Marga Molinari, the main antagonist of Botineras, a telenovela co-produced by Underground Contenidos, Endemol and Telefe between 2009 and 2010. For her work on these last two telenovelas, she received her second nomination for Martín Fierro Awards. Between the end of 2010 and the beginning of 2011, she recorded a travel program along different parts of the world along with Felipe Colombo, which is titled La vuelta al mundo, this being her debut as Television Presenter. The program aired during the summer of 2012. During 2011 it is called to star, along with Juan Gil Navarro, Eva De Dominici, Mónica Galán, Maximiliano Ghione and Justina Bustos, Dance!, Child-youth fiction that was made in Uruguay, which is a success in that country. She plays Laura Redondo, a dance teacher. In addition, she was one of the actresses invited in a chapter of El hombre de tu vida, unitary starring Guillermo Francella. In 2012, Isabel is in one of the two most important channels of Argentine television at the same time. This is due to the broadcast of the program La vuelta al mundo by Canal 13 and again in an antagonistic role in telecomedy Graduados by Telefe. For her work in this fiction, she is nominated for the third time to Martín Fierro Awards, winning the Award in competition with Nancy Dupláa, Carina Zampini, Celeste Cid and Vanesa González. It is the first prize for the actress, with three nominations. In March 2013 she recorded his participation in the video clip of the song Mírenla, by the Argentine rock band Ciro y los Persas. It is her first foray as the protagonist of a music clip. In 2014 she returns to Canal 13 in a fiction of Pol-ka Producciones, starring Guapas with Mercedes Morán, Carla Peterson, Florencia Bertotti and Araceli González. For this work, she is nominated for the fourth time to Martín Fierro Awards in the category of Best Leading Actress in a Novel. In February 2015 she stars in Telefe the miniseries Fronteras. She plays Dr. Sonia Miller, who loses her job in Buenos Aires, Argentina and is hired as a border doctor at a Misiones hospital. It is the first absolute leading role for the actress, leading the cast of fiction. In the same year, she starred in the web miniseries eLovers next to the soccer player Ezequiel Lavezzi. In January 2017 she returns to Telefe as the protagonist of the telenovela Amar, después de amar with Mariano Martínez, Eleonora Wexler and Federico Amador. In March 2018 she participated in some chapters of the miniseries Sandro de América, she played Daniela Paciani, one of the artist's wives.

Personal life 
From 1996 to 2006, Isabel Macedo was in a relationship with actor Facundo Arana.

When the model Carolina Ardohain attacked her for an alleged relationship Isabel had with her partner, the Chilean actor Benjamín Vicuña, in 2008. Which could never be proven. 

From 2010 to 2013, Isabel Macedo was in a relationship with the soccer player Federico Insúa.

In 2014, she began a relationship with the polista Martín Tassara, having separated from him the following year. 

In 2016, Isabel Macedo confirmed her relationship with the Governor of the Province of Salta Juan Manuel Urtubey. On September 24, 2016, she married the Governor of the Province of Salta Juan Manuel Urtubey. The ceremony took place in the residence "Finca Las Costas" of the governor, with around 400 guests among which there were numerous figures of politics and the artistic medium. On October 19, 2017 the couple announced that they were expecting their first child. On May 7, 2018, she gave birth to the couple's first child, a girl, whom they called Isabel Urtubey Macedo was born in the province of Salta. On June 4, 2022, she gave birth to the couple's second child, a girl, whom they called Julia Urtubey Macedo.

Filmography

Television

Movies

Theater

Television Programs

Videoclips

Awards and nominations

References

External links 
 

Argentine telenovela actresses
Living people
1975 births
Actresses from Buenos Aires